Equal Rights is the second studio album by Peter Tosh.  It was released in 1977 (see 1977 in music) on Columbia Records.

Content 
The song "Get Up, Stand Up", which was co-written by Bob Marley, was originally a single by Tosh's previous band, The Wailers, from their 1973 album Burnin'. "Downpressor Man" is a cover of "Sinner Man". "I Am that I Am" refers to a religious concept commonly referred to by that phrase.

Track listing
All songs composed and arranged by Peter Tosh except as shown.
Side 1
"Get Up, Stand Up" – 3:29 (Tosh, Bob Marley)
"Downpressor Man" – 6:25
"I Am that I Am" – 4:28
"Stepping Razor" (Joe Higgs; credited to Tosh) – 5:47
Side 2
"Equal Rights" – 5:58
"African" – 3:41
"Jah Guide" – 4:29
"Apartheid" – 5:31

Track listing on "The Definitive Remasters" 2002 EMI CD release
"Get Up, Stand Up"
"Downpressor Man"
"I Am That I Am"
"Stepping Razor"
"Equal Rights"
"African"
"Jah Guide"
"Apartheid"
"400 Years"
"Hammer" (Extended Version)
"Jah Man Inna Jamdung"
"Vampire"
"Babylon Queendom"
"You Can't Blame the Youth"
"(Know) Dem a Wicked"
"Pound Get a Blow"
"Stop That Train"
"Get Up Stand Up" (Long Version)
"Equal Rights" (Extended Long Version)
"I Am That I Am" (Long Version)
"Apartheid" (Long Version)
"Stepping Razor" (Alternative Long Version)
"Get Up Stand Up" (Alternate Version)
"Pick Myself Up" (Live)
"African" (Live)

Tracks 1-8 originally issued April 1977 as Equal Rights
Tracks 9-17 previously unreleased original session outtakes
Tracks 18-23 previously unreleased original session alternatives and long versions
Tracks 24-25 recorded on 1982 US tour

Personnel
Peter Tosh - vocals, guitar, keyboards
Bunny Wailer - backing vocals
Sly Dunbar - drums
Earl "Wia" Lindo - keyboards
Donald Kinsey - guitar, backing vocals
Robbie Shakespeare - bass
Mikey Chung - lead guitar
Al Anderson - lead guitar
Robert Lyn - organ
Keith Sterling - keyboards
Harold Butler - clavinet
Abdul Wali - guitar
Karl Pitterson - guitar 
Uziah Thompson - percussion
Skully - percussion
"Dirty" Harry Hall - tenor saxophone
Bobby Ellis - trumpet
Technical
Karl Pitterson - recording engineer
Alex Sadkin, Jack Nuber, Karl Pitterson - remix engineer
Herbie Miller, Ozzie Brown - production coordination 
Andy Engel - artwork
Kim Gottlieb - front cover photography

References

1977 albums
Rolling Stones Records albums
Peter Tosh albums
Reggae albums by Jamaican artists